Adam Egypt Mortimer is an American director, comic writer, and producer known for directing Daniel Isn't Real and Archenemy.

Biography 
Mortimer is from Boston and graduated from Columbia University in 1995 as an English major. He was a musician before deciding to enter filmmaking. He began his filmmaking career in directing music videos, promos, and commercials for big companies, including a documentary series commissioned by Sprite named Jerk All-Stars.

Mortimer was briefly in the comic scene by co-writing a 5-issue series named BALLISTIC with comic illustrator Darick Robertson in 2013.

In 2015, he made his directorial debut with the horror movie Some Kind of Hate. He directed a segment of the 2016 horror anthology film Holidays.

He co-wrote and directed the film Daniel Isn't Real, which premiered at South by Southwest on March 29, 2019. The movie received generally favorable reviews from critics.

Mortimer's most recent film, Archenemy, premiered in 2020.

Filmography

Awards and nominations 
Mortimer was nominated for two Fangoria Chainsaw Awards in 2020 and 2016, respectively, in the "Best Limited Release" category. He won the Best Director award for Daniel Isn't Real at the 2019 Brooklyn Horror Film Festival. He also won the Best Director Choice prize at the 2019 Bucheon International Fantastic Film Festival.

References 

American film directors
American film producers
American comics writers
American music video directors
Columbia College (New York) alumni
Living people
People from Boston
Year of birth missing (living people)